Stiles Rust Nettleton (April 7, 1834 – May 17, 1911) was an American politician in the state of Washington. He served in the Washington House of Representatives from 1895 to 1897.

References

1834 births
1911 deaths
Republican Party members of the Washington House of Representatives
19th-century American politicians